Cedrelinga is a genus of trees in the family Fabaceae. The only accepted species is Cedrelinga cateniformis, called tornillo or cedrorana, which is native to South America. It is occasionally harvested for its straight-grained timber.

References

Mimosoids
Monotypic Fabaceae genera
Trees of Peru
Trees of Brazil
Trees of Ecuador
Trees of Bolivia
Trees of Colombia
Trees of French Guiana
Trees of Venezuela
Taxa named by Adolpho Ducke